Taravella may refer to: 

 Alain Taravella (born 1948), French billionaire
 Croce Taravella, Italian painter
 Ingeniero Aeronáutico Ambrosio L.V. Taravella International Airport,  International Airport in  Córdoba
 J. P. Taravella High School, secondary school in Coral Springs, Florida